The Taylorcraft B is an American light, single-engine, high-wing general aviation monoplane, with two seats in side-by-side configuration, that was built by the Taylorcraft Aviation Corporation of Alliance, Ohio.

Production and construction
The Model B was constructed in large numbers during the late 1930s and early 1940s and was available for delivery from the factory as a land plane and a floatplane. Like many light aircraft of its day, the fuselage is constructed of welded steel tubing and covered with doped aircraft fabric. The wings are braced using steel-tube struts.

Operational history
The Model B was mainly bought by private pilot owners. Large numbers were flown in the United States, and many were sold to owners in Canada and several overseas countries, including those in Europe. Many are still active in 2022.

Variants
BC
1938 - Based on the Model A with a 50 hp Continental A-50-1 engine and modified wing construction, also known as the BC-50
BCS
1939 - Seaplane variant of the BC
BC-65
1939 - Model BC with a 65 hp Continental A-65-1 engine.
BCS-65
1939 - Seaplane variant of the BC-65.
BC-12-65 (L-2H)
1941 - As BC-65 except for minor structural changes and added elevator trim tab and a Continental A-65-7 engine.
BCS-12-65
1941 - Seaplane variant of the BC-12-65
BC-12D Twosome
1945 - Postwar production version of the BC-12-65 with a Continental A-65-8 engine with alternate tail surface, alternate one piece window and other minor changes.
BCS-12D
1946 - Seaplane variant of the BC-12D
BC-12D1
1946 - As the BC-12-D with left hand door, parking brake and right-hand wing tank removed
BCS-12D1
1946 - Seaplane variant of the BC-12D1

BC-12D-85 Sportsman
1948 - A BC-12D fitted with an 85 hp Continental C85-8F engine and increased power and gross weight.
BCS-12D-85
1948 - Seaplane variant of the BC-12D-85.
BC-12D-4-85
1949 - A BC-12D-85 fitted with an extra rear side window and a Continental C85-12F engine.
BCS-12D-4-85
1949 - Seaplane variant of the BC-12D-4-85.
Model 19 Sportsman
1951 - Development of the BC-12D-4-85, still with Continental C85-12F engine but with gross weight increased to 1500 lb. Revived in 1973 by the reformed Taylorcraft as the F-19 Sportsman with 100 hp Continental O-200 engine.
BF (L-2G)
1938 - 40 hp Franklin 4AC-150 engine.
BFS
1939 - Seaplane variant of the BF.
BF-60
1939 - As BF with a 60 hp Franklin 4AC-171 engine.
BFS-60
1939 - Seaplane variant of the BF-60.
BF-65
1941 - A BF with a 65 hp Franklin 4AC-176-B2 engine, also known as the BF-12-65 (L-2K).
BFS-65
1941 - Seaplane variant of the BF-65
BL
1938 - with a 50 hp Lycoming O-145-A1 engine, also known as the BL-50
BLS
1939 - Seaplane variant of the BL.

BL-65 (L-2F)
1939 - A BL with a 65 hp Lycoming O-145-B1 engine.
BLS-65
1939 - Seaplane variant of the BL-65.
BL-12-65 (L-2J)
1941 - A BL-65 with a Lycoming O-145-B1 engine and minor structural changes and added elevator trim.
BLS-12-65
1941 - Seaplane variant of the BL-12-65.

Notable accidents and incidents
November 24, 2021 – American YouTuber Trevor Jacob parachuted out of his BL-65 while piloting it, leaving the plane to crash into the ground. The Federal Aviation Administration deemed his actions intentional and reckless and revoked his pilot certificate.

Specifications (Taylorcraft 19)

See also

Notes and references

External links

1930s United States civil utility aircraft
High-wing aircraft
Taylorcraft aircraft
Single-engined tractor aircraft